Flying Microtonal Banana (subtitled Explorations into Microtonal Tuning, Volume 1) is the ninth studio album by Australian psychedelic rock band King Gizzard & the Lizard Wizard. It was released on 24 February 2017 on Flightless Records in Australia, ATO Records in the United States, and Heavenly Recordings in the United Kingdom. It is the first of five albums released by the band in 2017 and their first exploration of microtonal music, utilising custom built instruments.

The album earned the band a nomination for Best Group at the ARIA Music Awards of 2017, losing to Gang of Youths for Go Farther in Lightness. The album peaked at number two on the ARIA charts (their first top 10), and it is also the first album by the band to chart on the US Billboard 200, peaking at 170.

Music 
Subtitled Explorations into Microtonal Tuning, Volume 1, the album is recorded in quarter tone tuning, where an octave is divided into 24 (logarithmically) equal-distanced quarter tones; it was originally conceived to play on a baglama, so the band members used instruments specifically modified for microtonal tuning, as well as other Middle-Eastern instruments like the zurna. The name "Flying Microtonal Banana" comes from Stu Mackenzie's custom-built yellow guitar, fitted with additional microtonal frets.

The album has been described as psychedelic rock, acid rock and experimental rock, with elements of krautrock and Turkish music.

Reception 

Upon its release, Flying Microtonal Banana received positive reviews from music critics. On Metacritic, the album holds an average critic score of 72 out of 100, based on 15 reviews, indicating "generally favourable reviews".

AllMusic's Tim Sendra wrote, "it's clear that the experiment was a success and that the microtuned instruments fit in perfectly with their oddball aesthetic" describing the melodies as "more exotic (to ears attuned to Western music anyway) and complex" compared to previous albums. While comparing it unfavourably to its predecessor, Pitchfork contributor Stuart Bremen still commended the album, writing "if Flying Microtonal Bananas randomized approach is ultimately less transfixing than Nonagon Infinitys maniacal focus, it nonetheless shows that, after eight previous albums, this band's creativity and curiosity knows no bounds, and their singular balance of anarchy and accessibility is still in check. So even if you don't understand the first thing about microtonality, there's still plenty of flying banana here to keep you amused."

Accolades

Track listing 
Vinyl releases have tracks 1–3 on Side A, and tracks 4–9 on Side B.

Personnel 
Credits for Flying Microtonal Banana adapted from liner notes.

King Gizzard & the Lizard Wizard
 Michael Cavanagh – drum kit , bongos , percussion 
 Cook Craig – microtonal guitar , microtonal bass guitar 
 Ambrose Kenny-Smith – microtonal harmonica , vocals 
 Stu Mackenzie – microtonal guitar , microtonal bass guitar , piano , synthesizer , zurna , vocals , percussion 
 Eric Moore – drum kit , bongos 
 Lucas Skinner – microtonal bass guitar 
 Joey Walker – microtonal guitar , microtonal bass guitar , vocals 

Production
 Stu Mackenzie – recording
 Jarvis Taveniere – mixing
 Joe Carra – mastering
 Jason Galea – artwork and layout

Charts

References

External links
 

2017 albums
ATO Records albums
Heavenly Recordings albums
King Gizzard & the Lizard Wizard albums
Flightless (record label) albums
Acid rock albums
Experimental rock albums by Australian artists
Microtonality
Psychedelic rock albums by Australian artists
Krautrock albums